Prisad is a village in Municipality of Prilep. The village, along with 3 other villages, are known for being the name of an Antarctic Island.

Demographics
According to the 1467-68 Ottoman defter, Prisad appears as being largely inhabited by an Albanian population. The register displayed mixed Albanian and Slavic anthroponymy, with instances of individuals bearing both Slavic and Albanian names. The names are: Gjon son of Gjergj, Leka son of Marica, Gjin son of Marica, Liko son of Dor, Gjin son of Cenger, Gjin son of Kovaç, Lika son of Dim, Simo son of Nikola, Gjin son of Trushko, Stajko son of Andreja, Bogoj son of Leka, Pejo son of Dominiko, Drala son of Marin-it, Gjin son of Ilija, Nikola i biri i Bala.

According to the 2002 census, the village had a total of 5 inhabitants. Ethnic groups in the village include:

Macedonians 5

References

Villages in Prilep Municipality